Charles Ng Wang-wai  is the first CLP Holdings Professor of Sustainability and Chair Professor in the Department of Civil and Environmental Engineering at the Hong Kong University of Science and Technology (HKUST). He is also the vice-president of HKUST (Guangzhou) and the dean of the Fok Ying Tung Graduate School at HKUST, Clear Water Bay Campus. He is the immediate past president of the International Society for Soil Mechanics and Geotechnical Engineering (ISSMGE), where he served as the 17th President from 2017 to 2022.

Education 
Charles W. W. Ng attended the University of Bristol where he completed his PhD degree in civil engineering in 1993. From 1993 to 1995, he worked as a post-doctoral research associate with professors Malcolm Bolton and Sarah Springman at the University of Cambridge.

Career 
Ng joined HKUST in 1995 as assistant professor and was promoted to chair professor in 2011. He was conferred the first CLP Holdings Professor of Sustainability named professorship in 2017. He was appointed as the dean of HKUST Fok Ying Tung Graduate School at HKUST in 2020. He was appointed as the vice-president of HKUST (Guangzhou) campus in 2021.

Awards 
In 2002, Ng was the recipient of the Mao-Yisheng Youth Award by the Chinese Institute of Soil Mechanics and Geotechnical Engineering for his significant contributions in geotechnical engineering. In 2007, he received the Overseas and  Hong Kong, Macau Young Scholars Award by the National Science Foundation of China. In 2015, he received the 2nd Prize of Scientific Technological Advancement Award by the State Council of China and in 2020, he was the recipient of National Natural Science Award by the State Council of China. He was elected as a fellow of Royal Academy of Engineering in 2020.

Ng's contribution to geotechnical engineering has been recognised by different academic societies. He is an overseas fellow of the Churchill College, the University of Cambridge, a fellow of the Hong Kong Academy of Engineering Sciences and a Changjiang Scholar (2010–2013) (Chair Professorship in Geotechnical Engineering) by the Ministry of Education in China.

He is the recipient of multiple awards for his continuing research in soil mechanics and geotechnical engineering.

Professional affiliations 
Ng is a chartered Civil Engineer (CEng) and a Fellow of the Institution of Civil Engineers (UK), the American Society of Civil Engineers, and the Hong Kong Institution of Engineers. He currently serves as the 17th President of International Society for Soil Mechanics and Geotechnical Engineering (2017-2021).

Achievements 
Ng has published extensively in the field of unsaturated soil mechanics, soil-structure interaction, debris flow mitigation and geotechnical design resulting in over 350 SCI journal articles, 250 state-of-the-art conference papers, 3 reference textbooks and more than 80 keynote lectures. More than 55 PhD and 60 MPhil students have graduated under his supervision.

Personal life 
On 5 January 2022, Carrie Lam announced new warnings and restrictions against social gathering  due to potential COVID-19 outbreaks. These new restrictions came into effect from 7 January 2022 onwards for a period of 14 days (up to 20 January 2022). On 3 January 2022, Ng had attended a birthday party hosted by Witman Hung Wai-man, with 222 guests. At least one guest tested positive with COVID-19, causing many guests to be quarantined. Ng was photographed at the party without wearing a mask.

References

External links 
 Professor Charles Wang Wai Ng's web page

Year of birth missing (living people)
Living people
Alumni of the University of Bristol
Fellows of the Royal Academy of Engineering
Fellows of the Institution of Civil Engineers